"Good Time Boys" is a song by American rock band Red Hot Chili Peppers and the first song from their 1989 album, Mother's Milk. The song contains excerpts of "Bonin' in the Boneyard" by Fishbone, "Try" by Thelonious Monster and "White Girl" by X. The song is also notable for including backing vocals by the band's former guitarist, Jack Sherman, who was fired in 1985.

The song was last performed live on the band's Mother's Milk tour. It was also teased in January 2013 and January 2023. Both times in Australia.

Music video
The song was never released as a single however a promotional music video was shot and released in 1989 on the Hard 'n Heavy Vol. 2 video collection to promote the album.

The video features footage of the band performing the song with cut away footage of the band being interviewed discussing the album. The video has never officially been released by the band outside of this video collection, never played on television and never been released minus the interview footage. It is not acknowledged on the band's timeline as an official music video.

Personnel

Anthony Kiedis - lead vocals
John Frusciante - guitar, backing vocals
Flea - bass, backing vocals
Chad Smith - drums

Additional musicians
 Vicki Calhoun – backing vocals 
 Wag – backing vocals 
 Randy Ruff – backing vocals 
 Aklia Chinn – backing vocals 
 Jack Sherman – backing vocals 
 Joel Virgel Viergel – backing vocals 
 Iris Parker – backing vocals 
 Julie Ritter – backing vocals 
 Gretchen Seager – backing vocals 
 Laure Spinosa – backing vocals 
 Sir Babs – backing vocals 
 Merill Ward – backing vocals 
 Bruno Deron – backing vocals 
 Kristen Vigard – backing vocals

References

Red Hot Chili Peppers songs
1989 songs
Songs written by Flea (musician)
Songs written by Anthony Kiedis
Songs written by Chad Smith
Songs written by Jack Sherman (guitarist)
Song recordings produced by Michael Beinhorn
Alternative metal songs